Glen Edgar Edgerton (April 17, 1887 – April 9, 1976) was a United States Army officer, who served as the Governor of the Panama Canal Zone from 1940 to 1944.

Biography
He was born on April 17, 1887, to Alice and John Edgar Edgerton.  He graduated from Kansas State College in 1904 and from the United States Military Academy at West Point in 1908, where he was first in his class. He was chief engineer of the Alaska Road Commission from 1910 to 1915 and the Edgerton Highway in Alaska is named after him. He also went to the military Engineering Academy.

He served as Panama Canal maintenance engineer from 1936 to 1940. He was Governor of the Panama Canal Zone from 1940 to 1944. He retired from the army in 1949 and died on April 9, 1976 at Bethesda Naval Hospital.

References

External links
Generals of World War II

1887 births
1976 deaths
20th-century American engineers
Governors of the Panama Canal Zone
People of the Alaska Territory
United States Military Academy alumni
United States Army personnel of World War I
United States Army generals of World War II
United States Army generals